Lamb is an extinct town in Marion County, in the U.S. state of Missouri. The GNIS classifies it as a populated place.

The community was named after A. W. Lamb, a railroad official.

References

Ghost towns in Missouri
Former populated places in Marion County, Missouri